They Live is the second studio album from English electronic music duo Evil Nine. It was released on 20 October 2008 by Marine Parade. The album consisted of thirteen tracks and included contributions from autoKratz, El-P, Garvin Edwards (credited as Toastie Taylor) and John Ashford of The Last Shadow Puppets. Three singles were released from the album; the title track, "They Live", plus "Twist The Knife" and "All The Cash".

Track listing
 "They Live!" – 4:37
 "Feed on You" – 4:17
 "The Wait" (featuring autoKratz) – 3:56
 "Set It Off" (featuring Beans) – 3:50
 "All the Cash" (featuring El-P) – 4:53
 "Ngempa Guzon" – 1:14
 "Twist the Knife" (featuring Emily Breeze) – 3:29
 "How Do We Stop the Normals?" – 4:26
 "Dead Man Coming" (featuring Toastie Taylor) – 4:14
 "Benemoth" – 3:42
 "Born Again" – 1:15
 "Luke Goss" – 4:39
 "Icicles" (featuring Seraphim) – 4:52

Personnel

Evil Nine
 Tom Beaufoy – keyboards, turntables, programming, samples, vocoded vocals on "They Live"
 Patrick Pardy – bass, guitar, engineering, keyboards

Additional musicians
 James Ford - drums, additional programming
 autoKratz – vocals on "The Wait"
 Jaime Meline – raps on "All the Cash"
 Garvin Edwards (Toastie Taylor) – raps and vocals on "Dead Man Coming"
 Robert Stewart (Beans) – raps on "Set It Off"
 Emily Breeze – vocals on "Twist the Knife"
 John Ashton (The Last Shadow Puppets) - guitar on "Twist the Knife"
 Seraphim – vocals on "Icicles"
 Gary Day – bass on "They Live" & "Set It Off"

References

2008 albums
Evil Nine albums
Breakbeat albums
Big beat albums
Electronic albums